Chicago O'Hare International Airport , sometimes referred to as Chicago O'Hare, or simply O'Hare, is the main international airport serving Chicago, Illinois, located on the city's Northwest Side, approximately  northwest of the Loop business district. Operated by the Chicago Department of Aviation and covering , O'Hare has non-stop flights to 214 destinations in North America, South America, the Caribbean, Europe, Africa, Asia, the Middle East, Oceania, and the North Atlantic region as of November 2022. As of 2022, O'Hare is considered the world's most connected airport.

Designed to be the successor to Chicago's Midway International Airport, itself nicknamed the "busiest square mile in the world," O'Hare began as an airfield serving a Douglas manufacturing plant for C-54 military transports during World War II. It was renamed Orchard Field Airport in the mid-1940s and assigned the IATA code ORD. In 1949, it was renamed after aviator Edward "Butch" O'Hare, the U.S. Navy's first Medal of Honor recipient during that war. As the first major airport planned after World War II, O'Hare's innovative design pioneered concepts such as concourses, direct highway access to the terminal, jet bridges, and underground refueling systems.

O'Hare became famous during the jet age, holding the distinction as the world's busiest airport from 1963 to 1998; today, it is the world's fourth-busiest airport for passenger counts, serving 54 million passengers in 2021. In 2019, O'Hare had 919,704 aircraft movements, averaging 2,520 per day, the most of any airport in the world in part because of a large number of regional flights. On the ground, road access to the airport is offered by airport shuttle, bus, or taxis by Interstate 190 (Kennedy Expressway), which goes directly into the airport. O'Hare serves as a major hub for both United Airlines (which is headquartered in Willis Tower) and American Airlines. It is also a focus city for Spirit Airlines.

History

Establishment and defense efforts 

Soon after the opening of Chicago Municipal Airport in 1926, the City of Chicago realized more airport capacity would be needed. The city government investigated various sites in the 1930s but made little progress before America's entry into World War II.

O'Hare began as a manufacturing plant for Douglas C-54 Skymasters during World War II. The site was known as Orchard Place, previously a small German-American farming community. The  plant, in the northeast corner of what is now the airport, needed easy access to the workforce of the nation's second-largest city, as well as its railroads and location far from enemy threat. Some 655 C-54s were built at the plant, more than half of all produced. The airfield, from which the C-54s flew out, was known as Douglas Airport; initially, it had four  runways. Less known is the fact that it was the location of the Army Air Force's 803rd Specialized Depot, a unit charged with storing many captured enemy aircraft; a few representatives of this collection would eventually be transferred to the Smithsonian Institution's National Air and Space Museum.

Douglas Company's contract ended with the war's conclusion. Douglas considered building airliners at Orchard, but chose to concentrate civil production at its headquarters in Santa Monica, California. With the departure of Douglas the complex took the name Orchard Field Airport, and was assigned the IATA code ORD.

The United States Air Force used the field extensively during the Korean War; the airport then had no scheduled airline service. Although not its primary base in the area, the Air Force used O'Hare as a fighter base; it was home to the 62nd Fighter-Interceptor Squadron flying North American F-86 Sabres from 1950 to 1959. By 1960, the need for O'Hare as an active duty fighter base was diminishing, just as commercial business was picking up at the airport. The Air Force removed active-duty units from O'Hare and turned the station over to Continental Air Command, enabling them to base reserve and Air National Guard units there. As a result of a 1993 agreement between the City and the Department of Defense, the reserve base was closed on April 1, 1997, ending its career as the home of the 928th Airlift Wing and of the 126th Air Refueling Wing in 1999. At that time, the remaining  site came under the ownership of the Chicago Department of Aviation.

Early commercial development
In 1945 Chicago mayor Edward Kelly established a board to choose the site of a new airport to meet future demand. After considering various proposals, the board decided upon the Orchard Field site and acquired most of the federal government property in March 1946. The military retained a small parcel of property on the site and the right to use 25% of the airfield's operating capacity for free.

Ralph H. Burke devised an airport master plan based on the pioneering idea of what he called "split finger terminals", allowing a terminal building to be attached to "airline wings" (concourses), each providing space for gates and planes. (Pre-war airport designs had favored ever-larger single terminals, exemplified by Berlin's Tempelhof.) Burke's design also included underground refueling, direct highway access to the front of terminals, and direct rail access from downtown, all of which are utilized at airports worldwide today. O'Hare was the site of the world's first jet bridge in 1958, and successfully adapted slip form paving, developed for the nation's new Interstate highway system, for seamless concrete runways.

In 1949 the City renamed the facility O'Hare Airport to honor Edward "Butch" O'Hare, the U.S. Navy's first flying ace and Medal of Honor recipient in World War II. Its IATA code (ORD) remained unchanged, however, resulting in O'Hare being one of the few IATA codes bearing no connection to the airport's name or metropolitan area.

Arrival of passenger service and subsequent growth
Scheduled passenger service began in 1955, but growth was slow at first. Although Chicago had invested over $25 million in O'Hare, Midway remained the world's busiest airport and airlines were reluctant to move until highway access and other improvements were completed. The April 1957 Official Airline Guide listed 36 weekday departures from O'Hare, while Midway had 414. The expressway link to downtown Chicago, now known as the Kennedy Expressway, was completed in 1960. And new Terminals2 and3, designed by C. F. Murphy and Associates, opened on January 1, 1962.

The biggest factor driving the airlines from Midway to O'Hare was the jet airliner; the first scheduled jet at O'Hare was an American 707 from New York to Chicago to San Francisco on March 22, 1959. One-mile-square (1.6-kilometer-square) Midway had no space for the runways that 707s and DC-8s required. Airlines had been reluctant to move to O'Hare, but they naturally did not want to split their operations: in July 1962, the last fixed-wing scheduled airline flight in Chicago moved from Midway to O'Hare. Until United returned in July 1964, Midway's only scheduled airline was Chicago Helicopter Airways. The arrival of Midway's traffic quickly made O'Hare the world's busiest airport, serving 10 million passengers annually. Within two years, that number would double, with Chicagoans boasting that more people passed through O'Hare in 12 months than Ellis Island had processed in its entire existence. O'Hare remained the world's busiest airport until it was eclipsed by Hartsfield Jackson Atlanta International Airport in 1998.

O'Hare had four runways in 1955;  runway 14R/32L opened in 1956 and was extended to  a few years later, allowing nonstops to Europe. Runway 9R/27L (now 10L/28R) opened in 1968 and runway 4R/22L in 1971.

Post-deregulation developments

In the 1980s, after passage of US airline deregulation, the first major change at O'Hare occurred when TWA left Chicago for St. Louis as its main mid-continent hub. Although TWA had a large hangar complex at O'Hare and had started Constellation nonstops to Paris in 1958, by the time of deregulation its operation was losing $25 million a year under competition from United and American. Northwest likewise ceded O'Hare to the competition and shifted to a Minneapolis/St. Paul and Detroit-centered network by the early 1990s after acquiring Republic Airlines in 1986. Delta maintained an O'Hare hub for some time, even commissioning a new ConcourseL in 1983. Ultimately, Delta found competing from an inferior position at O'Hare too expensive and closed its Chicago hub in the 1990s, concentrating its upper Midwest operations at Cincinnati.

The dominant hubs established at O'Hare in the 1980s by United and American continue to operate today. United developed a new two-concourse Terminal1 (dubbed "The Terminal for Tomorrow"), designed by Helmut Jahn. It was built between 1985 and 1987 on the site of the original Terminal1; the structure, which includes 50 gates, is best known for its curved glass forms and the connecting underground tunnel between ConcoursesB andC. The tunnel is illuminated with a neon installation titled Sky's the Limit (1987) by Canadian artist Michael Hayden, which plays an airy, slow-tempo version of Rhapsody in Blue. American renovated and expanded its existing facilities in Terminal3 from 1987 to 1990; those renovations feature a flag-lined entrance hall to ConcoursesH/K.

The demolition of the original Terminal 1 in 1984 to make way for Jahn's design forced a "temporary" relocation of international flights into facilities called "Terminal4" on the ground floor of the airport's central parking garage. International passengers were then bused to and from their aircraft. Relocation finally ended with the completion of the 21-gate International Terminal in 1993 (now called Terminal5); it contains all customs facilities. Its location, on the site of the original cargo area and east of the terminal core, necessitated the construction of a peoplemover, which connected the terminal core with the new terminal as well as remote rental and parking lots.

Following deregulation and the buildup of the American and United hubs, O'Hare faced increasing delays from the late 1980s onward due to its inefficient runway layout; the airfield had remained unchanged since the addition of its last new runway (4R/22L) in 1971. O'Hare's three pairs of angled runways were meant to allow takeoffs into the wind, but they came at a cost: the various intersecting runways were both dangerous and inefficient. Official reports at the end of the 1990s ranked O'Hare as one of the worst-performing airports in the United States based on the percentage of delayed flights. In 2001, the Chicago Department of Aviation committed to an O'Hare Modernization Plan (OMP). Initially estimated at $6.6 billion, the OMP was to be paid by bonds issued against the increase in the federal passenger facility charge enacted that year and federal airport improvement funds. The modernization plan was approved by the FAA in October 2005 and involved a complete reconfiguration of the airfield. The OMP included the construction of four new runways, lengthening two existing runways, and decommissioning three old runways to provide O'Hare with six parallel runways and two crosswind runways.

The OMP was the subject of legal battles, both with suburbs who feared the new layout's noise implications as well as with survivors of persons interred in a cemetery the city proposed to relocate; some of the cases were not resolved until 2011. These issues, plus the reduction in traffic as a result of the 2008 financial crisis, delayed the OMP's completion; construction of the sixth and final parallel runway (9C/27C) began in 2016. Its completion in 2020, along with an extension of runway 9R/27L completed in 2021, concluded the OMP.

Expansion

In 2018 the city and airlines committed to PhaseI of a new Terminal Area Plan dubbed O'Hare 21. The plan is to build two all-new satellite concourses to the southwest of Concourse C, and to expand Terminals 2 and 5 with additional gates, lounges, and updates to operations all over the airport. (Terminal 5 will have ten new gates in addition to its expanded facilities, plus two additional gates to each accommodate an Airbus A380.) The expansion will enable same-terminal transfers between international and domestic flights, faster connections, improved facilities and technology for TSA and customs inspections and much larger landside amenities such as shopping and restaurants. A principal feature of the plan is the reorganization of the terminal core into an "alliance hub," the first in North America; airside connections and layout will be optimized around airline alliances. This will be made possible by the construction of the O'Hare Global Terminal (OGT) where Terminal2 currently stands. The OGT and two new satellite concourses will allow for expansion for both American's and United's international operations as well as easy interchange with their respective Oneworld (American) and Star Alliance (United) partner carriers, eliminating the need to transfer to Terminal 5.

After an international design competition that featured public voting on five final architectural proposals, the Studio ORD group, led by architect Jeanne Gang (in collaboration with SCB, Corgan, Milhouse, and STL Architect,) was selected to design the OGT, while Skidmore, Owings & Merrill LLP will design Satellites1 and2. By terms of the agreement, total costs of $8.5 billion for the project are to be borne by bonds issued by the city, which will be retired by airport usage fees paid by the airlines. O'Hare 21 is scheduled for completion of the two satellite terminals in 2027 and 2028, and overall completion in 2030.

Facilities

Terminals
O'Hare has four numbered passenger terminals with nine lettered concourses and a total of 213 gates.

Terminal 1 is used for United Airlines flights, as well as international departures by Lufthansa and All Nippon Airways. It contains 52 gates on two concourses, lettered B–C.
Terminal 2 is used for United Express, Air Canada, Alaska Airlines, and JetBlue flights. It contains 41 gates on two concourses, lettered E–F.
Terminal 3 is used for American Airlines, American Eagle, and Spirit Airlines flights, as well as international departures by Iberia and Japan Airlines. It contains 80 gates on four concourses, lettered G, H, K, and L.
Terminal 5 is the airport's international terminal. It contains 40 gates on one concourse, lettered M. All non pre–cleared international flights deplane here as it currently contains the airport's sole U.S. Customs and Border Protection facility. Most international airlines that serve O'Hare use this terminal for departures save for a limited number that utilize Terminals 1-3, and the terminal is also utilized by Delta Air Lines, Frontier Airlines and Southwest Airlines for domestic flights.

Terminals 1–3 are interconnected airside via a walkway. Terminal 5 is separated from the other terminals by a set of taxiways that cross over the airport's access road, requiring most passengers to exit security, ride a shuttle bus or take the Airport Transit System and then re–clear security. An additional shuttle bus provides an airside connection from Terminals 1 and 3 to Terminal 5, operating every 15 minutes from 11:30 am to 9:30 pm.

Runways
O'Hare has two sets of parallel runways, one on either side of the terminal complex. Each airfield has three parallel east–west runways (9L/27R, 9C/27C, and 9R/27L on the north side; 10L/28R, 10C/28C, and 10R/28L on the south side) and a crosswind runway oriented northeast–southwest (4R/22L on the north, 4L/22R on the south). The north crosswind runway, 4L/22R, sees limited usage due to intersecting 9R/27L and 9C/27C; however, runway 22L is often used for takeoffs during what is called "west flow" on the main runways. The airfield is managed by three FAA air traffic control towers. O'Hare has a voluntary nighttime (22:00–07:00) noise abatement program. Currently, O'Hare has the most runways of any civilian airport in the world, totaling eight.

Hotel
The Hilton Chicago O'Hare is between the terminal core and parking garage and is currently the only hotel on airport property. It is owned by the Chicago Department of Aviation and operated under an agreement with Hilton Hotels, who extended their agreement with the city by ten years in 2018.

Ground transportation
The O'Hare Airport Transit System shuttles passengers between the terminal core (Terminals 1–3), Terminal 5, and the O'Hare Multi-Modal Facility. The system, which re-opened on November 3, 2021, resumed round-the-clock service starting at 5 a.m. on Monday, April 18, 2022, after a nearly six-year renovation. Meanwhile, free shuttle buses also continue to run 24/7 and contribute to congestion, boarding on the upper (departures) level of all terminals. The Bus Shuttle center, located on the ground level of the parking garage between Terminals 1–3 and directly opposite the Hilton Hotel, provides a temporary boarding location for local hotel shuttles and regional public transport buses. The O'Hare Multi-Modal Facility is the home of all on-airport car rental firms as well as some extended parking. In addition, the Chicago-area commuter rail system, Metra, has a transfer station of its North Central Service (NCS) located at the northeast corner of the MMF; however, the NCS currently operates an occasional schedule on weekdays only.

Trains depart at intervals ranging from every four to thirty minutes, 24 hours a day. The station is located on the lower level of the parking garage, and can be accessed directly from Terminals1–3 via tunnel and from Terminal5 via shuttle bus.

O'Hare is directly served by Interstate 190, which offers interchanges with Mannheim Road (U.S. 12 and 45), the Tri-State Tollway (Interstate 294), and Interstate 90. I-90 continues as the Kennedy Expressway into downtown Chicago and becomes the Jane Addams Memorial Tollway northwest to Rockford and the Wisconsin state line.

Cargo facilities
There are presently two main cargo areas at O'Hare. The South Cargo Area was relocated in the 1980s from the airport's first air cargo facilities, located east of the terminal core, where Terminal5 now stands. Many of the structures in this new cargo area then had to be rebuilt, again, to allow for the OMP and specifically runway 10R/28L; as a result, what is now called the South Cargo Area is located between 10R/28L and 10C/28C. This large collection of facilities, in three sections (Southwest, South Central, and Southeast), was established mainly by traditional airline-based air cargo; Air France Cargo, American, JAL Cargo, KLM, Lufthansa Cargo, Northwest and United all built purpose-built, freestanding cargo facilities, although some of these are now leased out to dedicated cargo firms. In addition, the area contains two separate facilities for shipper FedEx and one for UPS.

The Northeast Cargo Area (NEC) is a conversion of the former military base (the Douglas plant area) at the northeast corner of the airport property. It is a new facility designed to increase O'Hare's cargo capacity by 50%. Two buildings currently make up the NEC: a  building completed in 2016, and a  building that was completed in 2017. A third structure will complete the NEC with another  of warehouse space.

Other facilities
In 2011, O'Hare became the first major airport to build an apiary on its property; every summer, it hosts as many as 75 hives and a million bees. The bees are maintained by 30 to 40 ex-offenders with little to no work experience and few marketable skills; they are primarily recruited from Chicago's North Lawndale neighborhood. They are taught beekeeping but also benefit from the bees' labor, turning it into bottled fresh honey, soaps, lip balms, candles and moisturizers marketed under the beelove product line. More than 500 persons have completed the program, transferring to jobs in manufacturing, food processing, customer service, and hospitality; the repeat-offender rate is reported to be less than 10%.

Airlines and destinations

Passenger

Notes:
 : Ethiopian Airlines flight from Addis Ababa to O'Hare stops at Dublin, but the flight from O'Hare to Addis Ababa is direct.

Cargo

Statistics

Top destinations

Airline market share

Annual traffic

On-Time performance (domestic major U.S. Carriers Only)

Major accidents and incidents

The following is a list of major crashes or incidents that occurred to planes at O'Hare, on approach, or just after takeoff from the airport:
 On September 17, 1961, Northwest Orient Airlines Flight 706, a Lockheed L-188 Electra, crashed upon takeoff, killing all 37 on board.
 On December 27, 1968, North Central Airlines Flight 458, a Convair CV-580, crashed into a hangar at O'Hare, killing 27 on board and one on the ground.
 On December 20, 1972, North Central Airlines Flight 575, a Douglas DC-9, crashed upon takeoff after colliding with Delta Airlines Flight 954, a Convair CV-880 which was taxiing across the active runway; 10 passengers on the DC-9 were killed.
 On February 9, 1998, American Airlines Flight 1340, a Boeing 727, crashed upon landing from Kansas City, injuring 22 passengers.
 On November 7, 2006, 12 United Airlines employees and a few witnesses outside the airport at Chicago O'Hare International Airport reported a UFO sighting. The Federal Aviation Administration declined to investigate the incident because the UFO was not seen on radar and called it a "weather phenomenon".
 On October 28, 2016, American Airlines Flight 383 aborted takeoff after a fire in the right engine of the Boeing 767; 20 passengers and one flight attendant were injured.
On January 28, 2022, a China Airlines cargo Boeing 747 skid on the ramp in icy conditions crashing into airport ground equipment. The aircraft's engines sustained moderate damage from the accident.
On August 5, 2022, a Qatar Airways cargo Boeing 777-200 with registration A7-BFH collided with a lamp post while taxiing near the remote de-ice facility. The lamp post became embedded in the leading edge of the right wing of the aircraft. There were no injuries.

See also
 List of the world's busiest airports, for a complete list of the busiest airports in the world

References

External links

 
 O'Hare Modernization Program, City of Chicago
 Council Ordinance authorizing ORD21 (with TAP attached, O2018-1124 (V1).pdf), City of Chicago
 O'Hare History, Northwest Chicago Historical Society
 The Fascinating History of Chicago's O'Hare International Airport: 1920–1960, 1960–2000, 2000 to Present
 
 

 Live KORD airplane map radar
 

 
Airports established in 1943
1944 establishments in Illinois
Airports in Cook County, Illinois
Airports in DuPage County, Illinois
American Airlines
Buildings and structures in Chicago
United Airlines